The Saviem J was a range of medium-duty trucks manufactured by the French manufacturers Saviem and Renault Véhicules Industriels between 1975 and 1980.

History
In the early 1970s, DAF, Magirus-Deutz, Volvo and Saviem formed the Club of Four to develop and manufacture a medium-duty truck. In order to do this, the company European Truck Development (ETD) was established in the Netherlands.

The Saviem version of this new truck range, the J, entered into production in 1975 and was fitted with MAN engines assembled under licence at Saviem's Limoges factory. Later, the range incorporated other engines. It went on sale in Britain in 1979, shortly before the name was changed to Renault.

Characteristics

Dimensions
The range was originally composed of three models: JN 90, JP 11 and JP 13, with the latter being subdivided into 13A, B and C.

The JP 13 had various combinations of engine and dimensions available.

Later, the company introduced the lighter, four-cylinder JK range: JK 60 (6-ton GVW), JK 65 (6.5-ton GVW) and JK 75 (7.5-ton GVW). The six-cylinder JN added various version between 7.5 and 8.5-ton GVW. Saviem also introduced the JR/JX range for trucks over 19-ton GVW.

Engines
The first engines of the J range were two 5.49L straight-six engines (the 597 and the 598) which had been fitted previously to the Saviems SM7 and SM8.

Transmission
A single gearbox, the S 5.35 type from ZF, was used on all the range. It was a fully synchronized five-speed unit. Later were incorporated the S 5.25 (for the JK models) and a Saviem-made unit.

Suspension
The J range had a suspension of leaf springs with dampers and anti-roll bars at the front and rear. The steering is a worm and sector setup.

References and sources
 The entry incorporates text translated from the corresponding French entry.

Vehicles introduced in 1975
Renault trucks
Saviem